I Can Change may refer to:

"I Can Change" (Brandon Flowers song)
"I Can Change" (LCD Soundsystem song)
"I Can Change", a song from the South Park: Bigger, Longer & Uncut soundtrack